The LG GD510, known as LG Pop (LG Pep in India), is an entry-level touchscreen mobile phone made by LG Electronics. It was first announced on September 30, 2009 and was released in October 2009. It is considered to be the successor of the LG Cookie. As of February 2010 the Pop has sold a million units.  The GD510 had a solar power option, a small panel which would fit on the back of the phone that would render electricity to the battery.  With the solar power option, the phone had a CO2 emissions calculation app -- in units of trees or mass of CO2.

Features 
 Touch Screen
 Java (MIDP 2.1)
 Music Player (MP3, AAC, AAC+, eAAC+, WMA)
 Music Multitasking (Messaging)
 Radio (Stereo FM radio with RDS)
 Social Networking Integration (Facebook, Myspace, Twitter)
 Video Player (MPEG4, H.263)
 Bluetooth v2.1 with A2DP
 Optional Solar Panel for battery charging

Specifications

General

 Form Factor: Touchscreen
 Dimensions: 97.8 × 49.5 × 11.2 mm
 Weight: 87 g
 Main Screen Type: TFT touchscreen, 256K colors
 Main Screen Size/Resolution: 240 x 400 pixels, 3.0 inches
 Messaging: SMS, MMS, Email(With SSL)
 Operating System: Flash UI
 Built-in Handsfree: Yes
 Voice-dial/memo: Yes
 Vibration: Yes
 Organiser: Yes
 Battery Stand-By: Up to 360 h
 Battery Talk Time: Up to 3 h 20 m
 solar charging 4 hrs for complete charging.

DATA
 2G Network: GSM 850 / 900 / 1800 / 1900
 Bluetooth: Yes, v2.1 with A2DP
 USB: Yes, microUSB 2.0
 GPRS: Class 12 (4+1/3+2/2+3/1+4 slots), 32 - 48 kbit/s
 EDGE: Class 12
 Speed: No
 WLAN: No

Multimedia
 3MP camera: 3 MP, 2048x1536 pixels, video(QVGA 15fps)
 Internal Memory: 42 MB shared memory
 Memory Slot: microSD, up to 32GB. However, the information is not clear. Some sites speak of max. 8GB, others of 16GB or 32GB...
CPU: ARM9
 Ram: 128MB
 Games: Yes
 Music: MP3 player
 Radio: Yes
 Ringtones: Polyphonic, MP3
 Speakers: Built-in handsfree speakerphone

Sounds
 Alert types: Vibration, MP3 ringtones
 Loudspeaker: Yes
 3.5mm jack: No

References

External links

GD510
Portable media players
Mobile phones introduced in 2009
Solar-powered mobile phones